Irina Latve (born 26 August 1981) is a Latvian middle-distance runner. She competed in the women's 800 metres at the 2000 Summer Olympics.

References

1981 births
Living people
Athletes (track and field) at the 2000 Summer Olympics
Latvian female middle-distance runners
Olympic athletes of Latvia
Place of birth missing (living people)